Alex Lopez may refer to:

Álex López Morón (born 1970), Spanish tennis player
Alex Lopez (swimmer) (born 1979), Puerto Rican swimmer
Alex Lopez (actress) (born 1980), Nigerian actress
Alex Lopez (born 1985), Mexican drummer for Suicide Silence
Álex López (footballer, born 1988), Spanish football midfielder
Alex López (footballer, born 1992), Honduran football attacking midfielder
Álex López (footballer, born 1993), Spanish football striker
Álex López (footballer, born 1997), Spanish football midfielder

See also
Alejandro López (disambiguation)
Ale López (born 1989), Spanish women's football defender